Ali Kires (born 24 January 1991) is a Turkish professional footballer who plays for Konyaspor.

References

External links
Goal

1991 births
Living people
Turkish footballers
Turkey under-21 international footballers
Turkey youth international footballers
Konyaspor footballers
Süper Lig players
Association football midfielders
TFF First League players

Tr.org